Surf is the debut studio album by American band The Social Experiment; it was released exclusively on iTunes as a free download on May 28, 2015. The album highlights trumpeter Nico Segal, formerly known as "Donnie Trumpet," and was created by Segal along with his band of collaborators called The Social Experiment — a self-described group of bohemian musicians, consisting of Segal, Chance the Rapper, Peter Cottontale, Greg Landfair Jr., and Nate Fox. The album was highly anticipated because of Chance's heavy involvement with the group, contributing vocals and some of the arrangements to the album. Surf was downloaded 618,000 times via iTunes in its first week, with over 10 million individual track downloads.

Release
Surf was surprise-released as an iTunes Exclusive free download shortly before midnight on May 28, 2015, after numerous delays. The album was originally to be released by the end of the year in 2014, but the release date was pushed back several times.  Preceding the album were singles "Sunday Candy" and "Nothing Came To Me", neither of which showed any of the various features on the album – since Chance is technically part of The Social Experiment, he is not regarded as a feature. "Sunday Candy", an ode to Chance's grandmother, featuring vocals by Chance The Rapper and various uncredited singers including Jamila Woods, was followed by "Nothing Came To Me", an instrumental track accompanied by a "silent film" starring Cara Delevingne.  The Austin Vesely, Ian Eastwood and Chance The Rapper-directed music video for Sunday Candy was released on YouTube on April 12, 2015.

Critical response

Surf was met with widespread acclaim from music critics who praised its varied musical elements and aesthetic. At Metacritic, the album received an average score of 86, based on 17 critics. In its first week, Surf was downloaded 618,000 times via iTunes, with over 10 million individual track downloads. Critics highly praised the artful style, lyrics, production, and incorporation of dance, jazz fusion, and neo-soul elements in the music of the album. The album's diverse range of guest artists also drew praise; while no officially credited features were listed in the iTunes track list, Surf contains contributions from Chance the Rapper, BJ The Chicago Kid, Big Sean, KYLE, Jamila Woods, Noname, DRAM, B.o.B, Busta Rhymes, J. Cole, Janelle Monáe, Quavo and Erykah Badu, among others.

Accolades
Surf has been ranked as one of the highest-acclaimed albums of 2015, according to review aggregator website Metacritic. Robert Christgau named it the sixth best album of 2015 in his ballot for The Village Voices annual Pazz & Jop critics poll.

Track listing
All tracks produced by 'The Social Experiment'. Although no features were listed on iTunes, many artists accompanied Nico Segal and The Social Experiment during the recording of Surf. 

Notes
"Slip Slide" contains uncredited vocals from B.o.B, BJ the Chicago Kid, Busta Rhymes, Janelle Monáe and Ady Suleiman.
"Warm Enough" contains uncredited vocals from J. Cole and Noname.
"Wanna Be Cool" contains uncredited vocals from Big Sean, Jeremih and Kyle.
"Windows" contains uncredited vocals from BJ the Chicago Kid and Raury.
"Caretaker" contains uncredited vocals from  DRAM
"Familiar" contains uncredited vocals from King L and Quavo.
"SmthnthtIwnt" contains uncredited vocals from Saba.
"Go" contains uncredited vocals from Jesse Boykins III, Mike Golden and Joey Purp.
"Questions" contains uncredited vocals from Jamila Woods.
"Rememory" contains uncredited vocals from Erykah Badu and Ady Suleiman.
"Sunday Candy" contains uncredited vocals from Jamila Woods.
"Pass the Vibes" contains uncredited vocals from Eric Butler.

References

2015 debut albums
Self-released albums